Matthie is a populated place situated in Maricopa County, Arizona, United States.

In 1933, Matthie Station on the Atchison, Topea and Santa Fe railroad was used as a connecting stub from Phoenix to the Prescott and Ash Fork line. The service was proposed to be cut in 1934.

Matthie was the location of the nearest train turnaround point to Wickenburg in 1950, lying approximately five miles west of the town.

The Matthie railroad junction was designated as a wildlife refuge in the 1950s by the state department due to drinking troughs laid out by the railroad engineer.

The Arizona and California Railroad Company bought the tracks ending at Matthie in 1991.

References

Populated places in Maricopa County, Arizona